About Joan is a 2022 drama film directed by Laurent Larivière. The film stars Isabelle Huppert, Lars Eidinger and Swann Arlaud. It is a French-German-Irish co-production.

The film had its world premiere at the 72nd Berlin International Film Festival on 15 February 2022. On this occasion, Huppert received the Honorary Golden Bear for her entire career.

Plot 
Joan Verra is an independent, loving woman with a free and adventurous spirit. When her first love returns without warning after years of absence, she decides not to tell him that they had a son together. This lie by omission is an opportunity for her to revisit her life: her youth in Ireland, her professional success, her loves and her relationship with her son. A seemingly fulfilled life, but one which hides a secret that she will have to face.

Cast 
 Isabelle Huppert as Joan Verra
 Freya Mavor as Joan Verra, in the 1970s
 Lars Eidinger as Tim Ardenne
 Swann Arlaud as Nathan Verra
 Louis Broust as Nathan Verra, in the 1980s
 Dimitri Doré as Nathan Verra, in the 1990s
 Florence Loiret-Caille as Madeleine Verra
 Stanley Townsend as Doug
 Éanna Hardwicke as Doug, in the 1970s
 Fabrice Scott as James

Production 
In September 2020, it was announced that Isabelle Huppert, Lars Eidinger and Swann Arlaud were cast in a new film directed by Laurent Larivière.

Filming took place for a week in Cologne, Germany, four weeks in Lyon, France and six days in Dublin, Ireland.

The film is a French-German-Irish co-production. Laurent Larivière wrote the script with François Decodts with the intent of making a "novel-like film spanning different periods over forty years in different countries, a film in which you could hear several languages." Four languages can be heard spoken in the film: English, German, French, and a bit of Japanese at the end of the film.

Release 
The film was an official selection at the 72nd Berlin International Film Festival, in the section Berlinale Special Gala. It had its world premiere at the Berlin International Film Festival on 15 February 2022. On this occasion, the actress Isabelle Huppert received the Honorary Golden Bear for her entire career. It was theatrically released in Germany by Camino Filmverleih on 31 August 2022. It was theatrically released in France by Haut et Court on 14 September 2022.

References

External links 
 
 

2022 films
2022 drama films
2020s English-language films
2020s French-language films
2020s German-language films
2020s French films
French drama films
German drama films
Irish drama films
Films shot in Cologne
Films shot in Dublin (city)
Films shot in Lyon